The 2016 Southwestern Athletic Conference baseball tournament was held at Wesley Barrow Stadium in New Orleans, Louisiana, from May 18 through 22.   won their first tournament championship and earned the conference's automatic bid to the 2016 NCAA Division I baseball tournament.  The Hornets swept through the tournament after completed an undefeated season in the conference's regular season.

The double elimination tournament features four teams from each division.

Seeding and format
The four eligible teams in each division are seeded one through four, with the top seed from each division facing the fourth seed from the opposite division in the first round, and so on.  The teams then played a two bracket, double-elimination tournament with a one-game final between the winners of each bracket.

Bracket

Notes 

 Alabama States sets a new tournament record with 27 runs in their victory over Southern.

References

Tournament
Southwestern Athletic Conference Baseball Tournament
Southwestern Athletic Conference baseball tournament
Southwestern Athletic Conference baseball tournament